The Royal University of Phnom Penh (RUPP;) is a national research university of Cambodia, located in the Phnom Penh capital. Established in 1960, it is the country's largest university. It hosts around 20,000 students in undergraduate and postgraduate programmes. It offers degrees in fields such as sciences, humanities and social sciences, engineering as well as vocational courses in fields such as information technology, electronics, psychology and tourism. RUPP provides Cambodia's foremost degree-level language programmes through the Institute of Foreign Languages. RUPP has full membership in the ASEAN University Network (AUN).

RUPP has over 420 full-time staff. All of its 294 academic staff hold tertiary qualifications, including 24 PhDs and 132 Master's degrees. They are supported by 140 administrative and maintenance staff. The university maintains linkage networks with Cambodian and international NGOs, universities and government ministries. As a result, international and non-government organizations and government offices regularly contribute adjunct faculty members to help expand RUPP's capacity.

History
The Royal University of Phnom Penh began as the Royal Khmer University in 1960. It opened during a period of intense growth in Cambodia and expanded to include a National Institute of Judicial and Economic Studies, a Royal School of Medicine, a National School of Commerce, a National Pedagogical Institute, a Faculty of Letters and Human Sciences, and a Faculty of Science and Technology. The language of instruction during this period was French.

With the growth of Cambodia's economy and an assertion of its historical role, modern buildings for that time were constructed in the style of the New Khmer Architecture, which has influences of Bauhaus, European post-modern architecture, and traditions from Angkor.

With the establishment of the Khmer Republic in 1970, the university became the Phnom Penh University. Between 1965 and 1975 there were nine faculties: the Ecole Normale Supérieure (Higher Normal College), Letters and Humanities, Science, Pharmacy, Law and Economics, Medicine and Dentistry, Commerce, Pedagogy, and the Languages Institute.

The Democratic Kampuchea period of 1975-1979 saw the closure and destruction of schools, the decimation of the teaching service and the cessation of formal education at the hands of the Khmer Rouge. Phung Ton, the dean of Phnom Penh University, was arrested, tortured and murdered at Tuol Sleng (S-21). During this period Phnom Penh University and all other educational institutions in Cambodia were closed down. Under this regime an education was perceived as a dangerous asset. Hence, the educated were targeted, and most of the university's teachers and students were killed. The campus was abandoned and remained deserted for almost five years. Of the educated people who survived, few remained in Cambodia once the borders reopened following the Vietnamese invasion that toppled Khmer Rouge rule.

In 1980, under the People's Republic of Kampuchea, the Ecole Normale Supérieure (Higher Normal College) reopened, again teaching predominantly in French. In 1981, the Institute of Foreign Languages (IFL) began, initially training students to become Vietnamese and Russian teachers. The purpose of both colleges was to provide surviving graduates of primary school or above with crash courses in teaching.

In 1988, the college and the IFL merged to create Phnom Penh University, and in 1996 the name was changed to the Royal University of Phnom Penh.

During the past decade, the university has grown and now includes the Faculty of Science, Faculty of Social Sciences and Humanities, and the Institute of Foreign Languages. In 2001, RUPP began its first postgraduate degrees with the graduate diploma and Master's courses in Tourism Development. A Master's degree in Biodiversity Conservation began in 2005 in partnership with conservation NGO Fauna and Flora International.

Organisation
 
 Faculty of Science 
Department of Biology
Department of Chemistry
Department of Computer Science
Department of Environmental Science 
Department of Mathematics
Department of Physics 
 Faculty of Social Sciences and Humanities
Department of Geography
Department of History
Department of International Business Management 
Department of Khmer Literature
Department of Linguistics
Department of Media and Communication
Department of Philosophy
Department of Psychology
Department of Sociology
Department of Social Work
Department of Tourism 
 Faculty of Engineering
Department of Automation and Supply Chain Systems Engineering 
Department of Bioengineering 
Department of Data Science Engineering
Department of Environmental Engineering 
Department of Information Technology Engineering
Department of Telecommunication and Electronic Engineering 
 Faculty of Development Studies
Department of Community Development
Department of Economic Development
Department of Natural Resources Management and Development 
 Faculty of Education 
Department of Educational Studies
Department of Higher Education Development and Management
Department of Lifelong Learning 
 Institute of Foreign Languages
Department of Chinese
Department of English
Department of French
Department of Japanese
Department of Korean
Institute of International Studies and Public Policy
Department of International Relations
Department of International Economics
Department of Political Science and Public Policy
Department of Vietnamese Studies
Centre for South East Asian Studies
Centre for Cambodian Studies
Cambodia 21st Century Maritime Silk Road Research Centre 
Silk Research Centre

Royal University of Phnom Penh Campus 2

The Campus 2 of the Royal University of Phnom Penh was built between 1989 and 1991 with the support of the Vietnamese Communist government. It is located on five hectares of land on Russian Federation Boulevard. Apart from the classrooms of the Departments of Geography, History and Sociology, there is also the Royal Academy of Cambodia on the compound that uses the former canteen as office space. The former university dormitories house the research center of the Royal Academy of Cambodia.

Oum Pom, the Secretary General of the Royal Academy of Cambodia, remembers: “In today’s Institute of Foreign Languages (IFL) was a political training centre after the Vietnamese took control of Cambodia. However, since the building was small, we decided to build a new and more comfortable one.” Oum Pom, who was the vice president of this school, adds that the professors and teachers, who were high-ranking officials of the Cambodian Communist government, gathered to choose the location and the building style. Formerly, the Parachute Unit of the Cambodian Army was located on the lot. Acting on the request of the People's Revolutionary Party of Kampuchea, the Vietnamese government decided to send architects and workers to construct the campus. The names of the Vietnamese architects have not been recorded.

Pom adds that the architecture of the new campus was influenced both by the ancient style of Khmer temples from the Angkor period and by a visit to some modern buildings such as the Hotel Cambodiana and the original university campus, where the political training centre was located at that time. Pom says: “We believe that the two ponds and its bridges were inspired by the ponds of the previous school (today’s IFL) and Angkor Wat. It makes the students feel calm and cool during the classes and helps them to relax.“ In ancient temple architecture, the Cambodian ancestors usually adorned the buildings by surrounding them with ponds and added bridges decorated with dragon heads, he adds.

The school was supposed to teach the students Marxist–Leninist theories and how mankind would evolve toward socialism. When the Vietnamese left Cambodia in 1992, the school was never opened; the Cambodian Communist government decided to hand the building over to the Ministry of Education.

Co-operation with Royal Government of Cambodia
The support of the Royal Government of Cambodia, particularly the Ministry of Education Youth and Sports (MOEYS) is critical to the life of RUPP. All degrees and course programs at RUPP have been recommended and supported by the government, which covers electricity and utility costs, provides staff salaries (approximately US$100/month), and provides important resources such as computers. The prime minister and other government representatives have participated in the university's graduation, cultural and opening ceremonies.

References

External links

Royal University of Phnom Penh homepage

Educational institutions established in 1960
Royal University of Phnom Penh
ASEAN University Network
Education in Phnom Penh
1960 establishments in Cambodia